Buciumeni is a commune in Ungheni District, Moldova. It is composed of three villages: Buciumeni, Buciumeni station and Florești.

References

Communes of Ungheni District